The 2023 BRANDT 200 was the first stock car race of the 2023 ARCA Menards Series season, and was the 60th running of the event. The race was held on Saturday, February 18, 2023, in Daytona Beach, Florida at Daytona International Speedway, a 2.5 mile (4 km) permanent tri-oval shaped asphalt superspeedway. The race was contested over 80 laps. In a chaotic race that brought several cautions, Greg Van Alst, driving for his own team, Greg Van Alst Motorsports, would win the race after making a last lap pass on Jason White for the lead. This was Alst's first career ARCA Menards Series win. To fill out the podium, Connor Mosack, driving for Joe Gibbs Racing, and Sean Corr, driving for Empire Racing, would finish 2nd and 3rd, respectively.

This race was known as the stock car debut for Frankie Muniz, the actor known for starring in the FOX sitcom, Malcolm in the Middle. This was his first start as part of his full-time season with Rette Jones Racing.

Background 
Daytona International Speedway is one of three superspeedways to hold NASCAR races, the other two being Indianapolis Motor Speedway and Talladega Superspeedway. The standard track at Daytona International Speedway is a four-turn superspeedway that is 2.5 miles (4.0 km) long. The track's turns are banked at 31 degrees, while the front stretch, the location of the finish line, is banked at 18 degrees.

Entry list 

 (R) denotes rookie driver.

Practice 
The first and only practice session was held on Thursday, February 16, at 4:05 PM EST, and would last for 50 minutes.

Qualifying 
Qualifying was held on Friday, February 17, at 1:30 PM EST. For qualifying, drivers were split into six different groups. The driver who sets the overall fastest lap will win the pole.

Race results

Standings after the race 

Drivers' Championship standings

Note: Only the first 10 positions are included for the driver standings.

References

NASCAR races at Daytona International Speedway
BRANDT 200
BRANDT 200